Pi Canis Majoris (π Canis Majoris; Latin for 'Greater Dog') is a binary star system in the southern constellation of Canis Major. It is visible to the naked eye, having an apparent visual magnitude of +4.69. Based upon an annual parallax shift of 33.80 mas as seen from Earth, this system is located 96.5 light years from the Sun. The star is moving in the general direction of the Sun with a radial velocity of −37.9 km/s. It will make its closest approach in around 733,000 years when it comes within .

The brighter primary, component A, is an F-type main-sequence star with a stellar classification of F1.5 V. It is a periodic variable star with a frequency of 11.09569 cycles per day (2.16 hours per cycle) and an amplitude of 0.0025 in magnitude. The star has an estimated 1.32 times the mass of the Sun and is radiating nine times the Sun's luminosity from its photosphere at an effective temperature of around 6,863 K. It displays a strong infrared excess at a wavelength of 24 μm and a weaker excess at 70 μm, indicating the presence of a circumstellar disk of dust with a temperature of 188 K, orbiting at 6.7 AU from the host star.

The magnitude 9.6 companion, component B, lies at an angular separation of 11.6 arc seconds from the primary as of 2008. Their projected separation is about 339 AU.

In popular culture 

This star is the origin of the alien crystal, and the destination of starship Salvare, on Netflix show Another Life.

See also 

 Canis Minor

References

F-type main-sequence stars
Canis Majoris, Pi
Canis Major
BD-19 1610
Canis Majoris, 19
051199
033302
2590
Binary stars